Steven John Zenchuk (born 20 November 1966 in Peterborough) is an English former professional footballer who played in the Football League, as a goalkeeper.

References

Sources
Profile at Neil Brown

1966 births
Living people
Sportspeople from Peterborough
English footballers
Association football goalkeepers
Holbeach United F.C. players
Stamford A.F.C. players
Peterborough United F.C. players
English Football League players